Nyctemera malaccana is a moth of the family Erebidae first described by Walter Karl Johann Roepke in 1957. It is found on Malacca in Malaysia.

References

Nyctemerina
Moths described in 1957